Anthony Charles Williams II (born May 16, 1975), better known by his stage name B. Slade, formerly known under the gospel moniker Tonéx, is an American singer, songwriter, actor, multi-instrumentalist, rapper, dancer, producer, and activist from San Diego, CA. He has gone by various names and aliases, but his primary stage name of choice had for years been "Tonéx". In 2010, he began using the stage name B.Slade in order to rebrand himself.

Williams has released several hundred songs on dozens of albums over the span of his career, while producing several others for both gospel and secular artists. He has won six Stellar Awards, a GMA Award, and received 2 Grammy nominations: one for Best Contemporary Soul Gospel Album for his 2004 gold album, Out the Box and another in 2009 for Best Urban/Soul Alternative Performance for his single, "Blend", from his 2009 mainstream (albeit theoretically Gospel) album, Unspoken.

Known more for his gospel recordings, his musical efforts have been known to blend a smorgasbord of styles, including pop, R&B, jazz, soul, funk, hip hop, rock, Latin, electro, punk and trance. His primary influences include Stevie Wonder, Billy Joel, Prince, Michael Jackson, Walter Hawkins, David Bowie, and Janet Jackson. His distinct sound and eclectic style of music led him to give his music its own genre per se, calling it "Nureau".

Life and music career

Early life
Born in 1975, Williams grew up in the San Diego, California area. His father, Anthony Williams, was Senior Pastor of the Truth Apostolic Community Church in suburban Spring Valley and served as a district elder in the California District Council of the Pentecostal Assemblies of the World (PAW). His mother, E. B. Williams, was a licensed minister in the PAW and served the church as Assistant Pastor. Anthony was the youngest of the Williams' six boys. Gospel music was the preferred choice at home, but other sounds made their way into Williams' environment. His father played saxophone for James Brown and Jackie Wilson, his mother sang in various girl groups, and his older brothers sneaked funk and R&B recordings into the house. Deciding early on a musical career, he took the name "Tonex" by the time he was 13, sometimes spelling it "Tonéx"; at the age of 16 he and his parents hired his first personal manager, Benjamin Jimerson (aka Benjamin Jimerson-Phillips) in 1991. Jimerson, who has since become a relatively successful movie producer, stated: "From the first moment I saw Tonex and he sang his first note, I realized I was dealing with a young man destined to become a major celebrity."

1996–2000: Early career
Rescue was still a small label, and Pronounced Toe-Nay was issued in a limited production run and distributed mostly from the back of Williams' car. Young gospel fans, however, quickly caught on to the innovative variety of music on Pronounced Toe-Nay. The album's producer, T. Boy, was an alter ego of Tonex himself. The album was divided by style into seven sections: hip-hop/rap, retro/funk, the future, jazz, mellow grooves, soul/gospel, and bonus tracks. In the recordings of Kirk Franklin and others, hip-hop had previously made inroads into gospel music, but this kind of wild eclectic mix was completely new. At the time, the digital reproduction of music was in its infancy, and rare copies of the album became prized possessions. Pronounced Toe-Nay garnered the attention of the producers at the 14th Annual Stellar Awards and placed him on the billing, and that performance by Tonéx made such a bold statement and had such an impact, it has been compared to the impact Michael Jackson made on the Motown 25th Anniversary Special back in 1983 when he introduced the moonwalk to the world.

2000–2004: As a rising gospel artist
By this time, national labels had come calling. Tonéx was signed to an unusual three-way deal that affiliated him with the successful and growing gospel label Verity, the pop imprint Zomba, and the durable hip-hop label Tommy Boy. Tonéx made his national debut with a re-release of his most successful independent album Pronounced Toe-Nay in 2000. His first high-profile television appearance was performing a medley of "Trinity" and "One Good Reason" on the Stellar Awards, which was a coup as Tonéx was a relative unknown at the time. He has dubbed his particular genre-spanning musical style "nureau."

Upon its release, Pronounced Toe-Nay bore 5 different record label logos: Rescue Records, the independent label that originally released the album; Mo' Soule Steppyn Records, Tonéx's then-active vanity imprint label; Tommy Boy Gospel, the label to which Tonéx was signed as an artist; Verity Records, the label to which his independent label Rescue Records sold his album's masters; and Jive Records, the mainstream umbrella over Verity Records. All of the material was produced, arranged, composed and performed by Tonéx, with guest appearances from his mother E.B. Williams, and the rapper Big J.

Some executives wanted to develop Tonéx's career in a secular direction, but he turned them down and kept to religious themes. "There are a lot of people who do similar things to what I do in R&B but I wanted to use gospel lyrics," he explained in an interview quoted on the Sphinx Management Web site.

After going through numerous revisions, his second album O2 was released in 2002. According to Tonéx, the title of his second album referred to the year of release, to the element oxygen, and to the album's status as his second major recording. O2 matched the stylistic eclecticism of Pronounced Toe-Nay, with each track diverging completely from the one before. The album spawned a major Christian radio hit in "God Has Not 4Got", a Stellar Award-winning song that displayed Tonéx's ability to create traditional choral gospel music as well as innovative pop fusions. USA TODAY gave it 3 stars (3 out of 4). The music video for the single "Bout A Thang" received heavy rotation on BET and MTV Australia, and featured energetic hip-hop dance and an urban image not usually associated with Gospel artists. O2 also featured a love song, "You", directed toward the artist's then-wife Yvette Williams (née Graham), a vocalist who at times went by the name Ms. Tonéx.

Becoming known to the wider contemporary Christian music community as a result of several music industry awards and award nominations, Tonéx went on tour with contemporary gospel artists Trin-i-Tee 5:7 and Men of Standard after the release of O2. Tonéx was moved up from opening act to headliner as audiences reacted enthusiastically to his music and his high falsetto voice. He performed once more at the Stellar Awards early in 2004 and won several awards.

Even though O2 brought him more mainstream success, Tonéx said that this album was not what he had in mind for release. He continued to release independent projects via the internet that showcased even more of his versatile creativity. Probably his most acclaimed of these works, Tonéx released Oak Park 92105 in 2003 on his now defunct Nureau Underground website in 2003, stating it was this album that he intended to release after Pronounced Toe-Nay, and not O2. Oak Park 92105 was a double album that mainly dealt with Tonéx's life growing up in the Oak Park community nestled in the eastern tip of southeast San Diego, California. It was eventually re-released on iTunes in 2005 with some new songs; however, the album did not come without controversy, as Tonéx opted to include a "parental advisory: explicit lyrics" notice on the front cover of the album, making it the first album by a Christian-based artist to carry the notice. Tonéx said the "explicit lyrics" notice is not a result of "cussing" on a record but rather content that "might be a little too deep for children."

2004–2006: Out The Box and accolade
His 2004 live double CD Out The Box earned him the most widespread acclaim so far. Divided into segments ranging from traditional gospel and praise anthems to splashes of urban dance, rock, and hip-hop, the ambitious Out The Box was a sprawling double disc set with 36 tracks, which included innovative intros, interludes, and a number of studio tracks. The supporting cast included a 10-piece band, 4 dancers, a 16-voice ensemble, and a 40-voice choir. Notable guest appearances on the album included Kirk Franklin, who plays piano in the live version of "God Has Not 4Got" and appears as an artist on "Since Jesus Came", and frequent Prince percussionist Sheila E, who appears on the Latin-flavored "Todos Juntos".

Out The Box debuted at No. 1 on the Billboard magazine Top Gospel Album Chart in September 2004, appeared on Billboards Top 200 and Top R&B Chart, was No. 5 on the Contemporary Christian Chart, and to date has sold over 500,000 copies. He also netted a Grammy nomination for Best Contemporary Soul Gospel Album the following year, and had another bonafide Christian radio hit with the ballad "Make Me Over". In 2005, Tonéx won a total of six Stellar Awards including "Artist of the Year" for Out The Box.

2006–2010: Controversy, turbulence, and retirement from gospel
In July 2004, his father died, forcing him to take on the responsibility of becoming senior pastor of their family's church in his stead. He also divorced his wife of five years, Yvette. In 2006, Verity Records sued Williams for one million dollars citing breach of contract. Subsequently, Tonéx announced that he would retire from the Gospel music industry, frustrated by politics and mistreatment. Following the announcement, Kirk Franklin posted a personal blog on his own website sympathizing with the artist feeling "the weight of an industry that is only built to make money, not heal broken souls." He continued releasing music independently, using MySpace as his primary vehicle for promotion.

In March 2007, a reconciliation with Zomba Label Group was announced, which would be a joint venture for his Nureau Ink label. The deal was struck under the auspices of new Zomba president James "Jazzy" Jordan (who previously had guided the careers of R. Kelly and Salt-N-Pepa). With a new record deal under his belt, he was preparing to release a double disc set titled Stereotype: Steel & Velvet, which was slated to be released on September 11, 2007, and was purportedly supposed to do for his career what Thriller did for Michael Jackson and what Purple Rain did for Prince. However, in June 2007, another split with Zomba was announced, fueled by his leaking of the vitriolic and profanity-laden song "The Naked Truth", along with several similarly themed blogs and videos. Tonéx cited label frustration as one of the reasons he leaked the song, and he soon faced much scrutiny within the Gospel arena for the explicit language and the angry tone of the song and its subsequent blogs. He later would close down his social networking sites for several months before resurfacing on the web in January 2008.

Recreating a softer gospel-friendly image, Williams changed his stage name to Ton3x (or TON3X) in 2008. He left the Verity Records family and signed under the umbrella of Battery Records, a label imprint of Sony/BMG. His only Battery Records release was the album Unspoken, released on March 17, 2009. The first single from that album, entitled "Blend", was unexpectedly nominated for a Grammy Award for Best Urban/Alternative Performance, despite very little promotional/financial support from Sony/Battery and garnered the artist his first non-gospel Grammy nomination. That year, he would also present awards at the Grammy pre-telecast, including the first two awards given to Lady Gaga, who was already backstage preparing for her show-opening performance.

In September 2009, The Word Network aired an appearance of Tonéx on The Lexi Show. Starting out as another promotional tool for his music, the interview unexpectedly changed directions, leading to Williams candidly expressing his views on sexuality and revealing his own same-sex attraction. Though his sexual orientation had already been highly speculated within the African American and gospel communities, the unapologetic tone of these revelations were condemned by conservative Christians, and bookings and appearances were universally cancelled, eventually leading to Williams being excommunicated. The artist would later say that he was "caught off guard" by the show's line of questioning but that he answered every question truthfully.

On December 29, 2009, Tonéx's website, as well as his Twitter and Facebook accounts, reported that the artist's mother, Evangelist and vocalist E.B. Williams, had died the day before. Williams would soon end his pastoral duties at his family's church.

On June 9, 2010, Tonéx announced what would be his final mixtape, the digital-only release The Parking Lot. The mixtape was also distributed in NYC that night after what would be his final performance. On June 15, 2010, the brand Tonéx/TON3X was officially and permanently retired. A "Tonéx Vault" was created on Bandcamp to share rare and previously unreleased material like the shelved Verity project, Gosp0p.

2010–2013: Rebirth as B. Slade and a return to independence
Recreating himself as an out indie R&B/glam pop artist, the artist formerly known as Tonéx underwent a re-branding, dubbing himself B. Slade''' and using digital media to release his new music and philosophies. The name change was inspired by the character Brian Slade from the art film Velvet Goldmine. Though he continues to receive much resistance from his past, conservative gospel fans, his new-found transparency and honest lyrics have helped him carve a niche in the LGBT music genre, which itself is slowly gaining acceptance in the mainstream field. Albums announced and partially produced under the Tonéx brand like A Brilliant Catastrophe, his Michael and Janet Jackson tribute mixtape, and the long-awaited, aforementioned Stereotype were all officially released during this time. B.Slade performed "You Make Me Feel (Mighty Real)" as a tribute to disco singer Sylvester at the 7th Annual OUTMUSIC Awards. His full-length album Diesel, was released via his own label Suxxess Records on July 19, 2011.

After completing his stint in the musical The Who's Tommy in the summer of 2011, B.Slade began work on his next concept album, Knowing. An ambitious "pop opera" narrating a dystopian take on the future of the major record label monopoly, the album will serve as a soundtrack that the artist plans to turn into a feature film musical. Knowing was scheduled for a release on Christmas Day 2011 (another album entitled Stealth was released on this day instead), but after a few delays was released discretely in memory of Whitney Houston on February 11, 2012.

In the fall of 2012, B.Slade embarked on his "Sex, Drugs and Sushi US Tour", doing shows in Chicago, New York and taking residency at the WitZend in Venice, LA during the months of September and November. He was nominated for four awards at the 8th Annual OUTMUSIC Awards, winning one for Best R&B/Soul Song. He released another album, Stunt B%$@H, on January 25, 2013.

 2014–present 

2014 saw a resurgence from the artist as a viable mainstream producer and songwriter, placing songs on albums from Sheila E. (Icon) and Faith Evans (Incomparable). He also wrote and co-produced Angie Fisher's smash hit single, "I.R.S.". The song was instantly a runaway hit upon debut on Stevie Wonder's L.A.-based radio station KJLH, before going nationwide and peaking at No. 29 on Billboards Adult R&B chart shortly thereafter. "I.R.S." was nominated for Best Traditional R&B Performance at the 57th Annual Grammy Awards, garnering Fisher her first Grammy nod and giving him his third. He is currently working with Fisher on her debut album from Hidden Beach Records.

In 2015, he co-wrote several songs on Elijah Blake's debut album, including the smash hit "I Just Wanna..." (which peaked at No. 23 on Billboard's Hot R&B Songs chart) and its title track, "Shadows & Diamonds". He also wrote and arranged the song "Unhappy" from Jordin Sparks' third album, Right Here Right Now, and produced comeback singles from Tisha Campbell-Martin and Chaka Khan. He was also a singer, writer and producer on Snoop Dogg's acclaimed 2016 Gospel compilation album, Bible of Love.

Acting and musical theatre
Along with the many changes made by Williams in 2008, a foray into acting became part of his long list of endeavors. Williams made his film debut in the 2008 Charlie Murphy comedy The Hustle, which was released to home video in 2011. In September 2008, he played the role of James "Thunder" Early in a San Diego production of the Broadway musical Dreamgirls. Later in 2008 and early 2009, Williams played the character of Rolin in Princess & The Black Eyed Pea at the Lyceum Theater in San Diego. In 2011, he played the starring role in San Diego Repertory Theatre's production of The Who's Tommy, His performance earned him the Craig Noel Award for Best Male Lead Performance in a Musical.

TV and movie soundtracks
Williams sang and produced the opening song for the hit UPN television series One on One. His production was featured on the song "Off We Go" from the J. Lo/Ben Affleck film Gigli and in BET Films original movie The Walk starring Eva Marcille. "Cry No More" from the album Pronounced Toe-Nay was featured in the HBO film Prison Song starring Q-Tip and Mary J. Blige, while the track "The Good Song 2005", a remake of the song "The Good Song", was included on the soundtrack of the action movie xXx: State of the Union starring Ice Cube. B.Slade's song "Don't Wake Me" was featured on the second episode of the 2013 BET series Second Generation Wayans. In 2013, he produced the score for the 44th Annual NAACP Image Awards telecast. In 2014, Williams produced and co-wrote the theme song to OWN (The Oprah Winfrey Network) series, Flex & Shanice, starring Flex Alexander and Shanice Wilson, and guest-starred on a number of episodes. The first season of the series garnered two singles written & produced by B.Slade, "Gotta Blame Me" and "We Can Fly". He also performed the theme song for Bounce TV's sitcom One Love.

In 2021, Williams guest-starred on Pose in the episode titled "Take Me to Church."

Media appearances
In 2005, Williams co-hosted the 20th Annual Stellar Awards with Donnie McClurkin and Yolanda Adams. As "DJ Tonéx" he hosted his own syndicated contemporary gospel radio show in partnership with SupeRadio Networks and Blue Sky Productions entitled Club Virtue from 2005 to 2007. He also briefly hosted the BET J (now BET Her) show Lifted which blended positive secular and gospel music programming. In 2010, The New Yorker published a lengthy article on the artist, highlighting his journey as one of the first major gospel artists to come out.

Public image
Williams' appearance has included extremely conservative suits with close cropped hair, outlandish, flamboyant garb with feather boas, fur coats, punk-inspired multi-colored hairstyles, Sanjaya-like headpieces, Stevie Wonder-style dreadlocks and also platform shoes, that brought to mind the "glam" rock bands of the 1970s and 1980s. As Tonéx, his image raised eyebrows in the conservative gospel and contemporary Christian music communities, and he eventually took the sharper edges off his look for a short time. But he made no apologies. "It wasn't me trying to make a statement; I've always been different," he told George Varga of the San Diego Union-Tribune. "And it really worked. Out of church, people are always asking me what my tattoos mean."

Solo Discography

as TonéxMajor label releases2000: Pronounced Toe-Nay
2002: O2
 2003: Oak Park 92105
2004: Out The Box
2009: Unspoken
2012: Playlist: The Very Best of Tonéx (compilation)Independent and underground releases1994: Silent X: The Self Confrontation
1995: Damage
1997: Pronounced Toe-Nay (underground release)
1999: Personal Jesus (Remixes)
2000: Circu$$
2001: Tonéx Presents MSS Dynasty: The Hostile Takeover
2003: The O'ryn Project: Figure 'O Speech
2003: Protranslutionary
2003: Oak Park 92105 (underground release)
2003: Remyx: Pronounced Ree-Mix
2005: Ain't Remyx
2005: Oak Park 92105 (iTunes release)
2006: Oak Park 921'o6 Syntax Records
2006: Banganyn EP
2006: The London Letters
2007: Oak Park 921'o6 Japanese Import
2007: Stereotype: Steel & Velvet (MySpace release, listen-only)
2008: T.Bizzy: The Album
2008: Banganyn Remyxes
2008: Tonéx Presents T.R.O.N. (The Ryderz of Nureaumerica)
2008: The Naked Truth
2008: Bapost.o.g.i.c.
2008: Rainbow EP
2009: TEMET NOSCE Nag Champion Mixtape
2009: Circu$$ (Digital Release, Final Configuration)
2009: OakPark 921'06 (Digital Release)
2009: Baposto.g.i.c. Mixtape (Digital Tracked Version)
2009: Personal Jesus: Remixes (Digital EP)
2010: The Parking Lot (Digital Release)
2011: Gosp0p (Digital Release)Singles1993: "Ain't Nobody Better: The Remyxes"
1997: "Restoration "
1997: "Personal Jesus"
1998: "Mark of the Beast"
1999: "One Sunday Morning"/"For the Life of Me"
1999: "Mad"
2000: "Personal Jesus"
2002: "Bout a Thang"
2002: "God Has Not 4got"
2002: "That's When"
2004: "Doesn't Really Matter"
2004: "Make Me Over"
2004: "Since Jesus Came"/"Todos Juntos"

as B.Slade

2010: A Brilliant Catastrophe (Alpha)
2010: A Brilliant Catastrophe (Beta)
2011: Stereotype: Collector's Edition
2011: Diesel
2011: Stealth
2012: Knowing
2012: Deep Purple
2013: Stunt B%$@H
2013: My September Issue [Limited Edition]
2014: Anything For Wifey (Music From And Inspired by the Original Motion Picture)
2014: My September Reissue
2015: Shade, Smoke & Treez
2015: DeLorean
2016: Ferrari
2017: B.Slade
2019: BLEU.
2019: TaurusCompilations and Mixtapes'2010: Dawn O' the Unicorn (mixtape)
2010: Dance Floor Arsonist: The Jack5on Magic Mixtape2011: Songs O' Lament2012: The Children 
2012: Cigar (compilation)
2012: Deep & Slow (mixtape)
2012: B.Slade Live at the WitZend2017: The Black Belt2020: Out the Box 2: The Separation of Church and State2020: Out the Box 3: The United States of GenesisAwards and nominations

Music

BET Awards

|-
| style="text-align:center;"| 2003
| Tonéx
| Best Gospel Artist 
| 

GMA Dove Awards

|-
| style="text-align:center;"| 2001
| Virtuosity  by Virtue
| Urban Album of the Year (producer)
| 
|-
| style="text-align:center;"| 2003
| The Fault Is History  by Souljahz
| Urban Album of the Year (producer)
| 
|-
| style="text-align:center;"| 2004
| "Let Go"  by Souljahz
| Urban Recorded Song of the Year (songwriter)
| 
|-
| style="text-align:center;"| 2005
| Out the Box| Urban Album of the Year 
| 

Grammy Awards

|-
| style="text-align:center;"| 2005
| Out the Box| Best Contemporary Soul Gospel Album 
| 
|-
| style="text-align:center;"| 2010
| "Blend"
| Best Urban/Alternative Performance 
| 

OUTMUSIC Awards

|-
| style="text-align:center;" rowspan="4"| 2012 
| "Elegant Simple"
| Best Rock Song
| 
|-
| "Phony Pony"  feat. Jaila Simms, Trevon James, & DDM
| Best Hip-Hop/Rap Song
| 
|-
| "I'm Done"  feat. Yummy Bingham
| Best R&B/Soul Song
| 
|-
| "Get Over You"  feat. Frankie Knuckles
| Best Dance/Electronica 
| 

Stellar Awards

|-
| style="text-align:center;"| 1999
| Pronounced Toe-Nay| Rap/Hip Hop Gospel CD of the Year
| 
|-
| style="text-align:center;" rowspan="7"| 2003
| "God Has Not 4 Got"
| Song of the Year
| 
|-
| rowspan="4"| O2| Male Vocalist of the Year
| 
|-
| Contemporary CD of the Year
| 
|-
| Rap/Hip Hop Gospel CD of the Year
| 
|-
| Recorded Music Package of the Year
| 
|-
| "'Bout A Thang"
| Music Video of the Year
| 
|-
| Virtuosity!  by Virtue
| Urban/Inspirational Performance of the Year (producer)
| 
|-
| style="text-align:center;" rowspan="6"| 2005
| rowspan="4"| Out the Box| Artist of the Year
| 
|-
| Contemporary Male Vocalist of the Year
| 
|-
| Contemporary CD of the Year
| 
|-
| Urban/Inspirational Performance of the Year
| 
|-
| "Make Me Over"
| Song of the Year
| 
|-
| "Thank Q"
| Rap/Hip Hop Gospel CD of the Year
| 

Theatre

Craig Noel Awards

|-
| style="text-align:center;"| 2011
| The Who's Tommy''
| Lead Performance in a Musical, Male
|

See also
List of smooth jazz performers

References

External links

B.Slade official website

Urban contemporary gospel musicians
American gospel singers
20th-century African-American male singers
American multi-instrumentalists
Musicians from San Diego
1975 births
Living people
LGBT African Americans
LGBT Pentecostals
LGBT rappers
African-American Christians
Singer-songwriters from California
American gay musicians
21st-century American singers
21st-century American male singers
African-American songwriters
20th-century LGBT people
21st-century LGBT people
21st-century African-American male singers
American male singer-songwriters